This is a list of the Hewlett-Packard 700 series computer models in Sweden. In March–July 2002 Hewlett Packard was producing a new high budget desktop PC series for home users, which replaced the 7900 series from late 2001. They all were sold at higher prices in comparison with 400 series.

Like its predecessor it also had Pentium 4 processors and 7200 rpm hard drives. The new feature coming with the 700 PC series was bluetooth, DVD+RW Drive and 3.06 GHz processor in the model Pavilion 793.uk (only sold in the United Kingdom) which became the first HP PC ever running at the frequency 3.06 GHz.

In May 2002 the first processors with 533 MT/s bus speed came which facilitates manufacture and in November with 3.06 GHz frequency but note that a 3.06 GHz system were only available in the United Kingdom. The 700 series  were launched in December 2002 for the public in the United States and several European countries and sold out in millions during December 2002 and 2003.

Desktop PCs

Hewlett-Packard 700
All were running v.90 modems

See also
List of HP Pavilion 400 series in Sweden

References

Pavilion 700